No. 203 Squadron RAF was originally formed as No. 3 Squadron Royal Naval Air Service.  It was renumbered No. 203 when the Royal Air Force was formed on 1 April 1918.

History

First World War
The squadron can be traced to The Eastchurch Squadron, which formed Eastchurch in February 1914. After mobilisation at the start of WWI it was renamed No.3 Wing RNAS, and then later as No.3 (Naval) Squadron. In March 1915, the squadron, under the command of Commander Charles Samson, moved to the island of Tenedos, and began operating 18 aircraft in support of the Gallipoli Campaign. In the first weeks of the campaign they took over 700 photographs of the peninsula, and conducted other ground support tasks including spotting for naval gunfire, and reporting the movements of Ottoman troops. On 21 June 1915, the squadron became No. 3 Wing RNAS and was moved to Imbros. On 19 November, during a raid against a railway junction near the Maritsa River in Bulgaria, Squadron Commander Richard Bell Davies won the Victoria Cross for landing to rescue a pilot who had been shot down, in the face of intense enemy fire. The squadron returned to the UK at the end of 1915, and was disbanded. 

A new No. 3 Squadron was formed at Saint Pol on 5 November 1916 from elements of No. 1 Wing RNAS. It then served as a fighter squadron on the Western Front. Among the numerous types of aircraft it was equipped with were the Nieuport 17, Nieuport 21, and Sopwith Pup, followed later by the Sopwith Camel.

Among its notable Officers Commanding were Canada's first ace, Redford Mulock; Lloyd S. Breadner, future Air Marshal of the Royal Canadian Air Force; Raymond Collishaw, sixth scoring ace of the war; and Tom F. Hazell, the Royal Air Force's tenth scoring ace of the war. The squadron produced a number of other notable aces, including
Leonard Henry Rochford;
Arthur Whealy;
James Alpheus Glen;
Edwin Hayne;
William Sidebottom;
Frederick C. Armstrong;
Joseph Stewart Temple Fall;
Harold Beamish;
future Air Marshal Aubrey Ellwood;
John Joseph Malone;
John Denis Breakey;
Frederick Britnell;
Francis Casey;
Australia's highest scoring ace, Robert A. Little;
Harold Spencer Kerby;
Alfred Williams Carter; and
Herbert Travers.

Eleven of the squadron's 23 aces were Canadian. The squadron claimed about 250 aerial victories during World War I.

Inter-war years
On 21 January 1920, the squadron disbanded. In 1929 the squadron reformed as a reconnaissance squadron operating Supermarine Southampton flying boats.

Second World War
Shortly before the start of the war the squadron was re-equipped with Short Singapore IIIs and in 1940 with Bristol Blenheims. The squadron flew patrols over the Red Sea from Basra. At the end of 1941 the squadron operated Bristol Blenheim IV, Mediterranean from various bases in Western Egypt, flying patrols from the Libyan coast out as far as Crete. In 1942 the squadron re-equipped with Martin Baltimore aircraft and was involved in operations in Syria. In 1943 the squadron was posted to RAF Santacruz India and was re-equipped with Vickers Wellingtons to fly coastal patrols. The squadron converted to Consolidated Liberator aircraft in November 1944 and began anti-shipping patrols over the Bay of Bengal.

Post war

The squadron returned to the UK in 1947 and re-equipped with Avro Lancasters. In July 1954, the squadron was flying Neptune MR.2s from RAF Topcliffe, along with No.s No. 36 and No. 210 Squadrons as part of No. 19 Group, RAF Coastal Command. The squadron remained a Maritime Reconnaissance squadron for the remainder of its existence operating Avro Shackletons and then Hawker Siddeley Nimrods from RAF Luqa between July 1971 and December 1977. The squadron disbanded on 31 December 1977 at RAF Luqa in Malta, by which time it was part of No. 18 Group within RAF Strike Command.

Sea Kings
The squadron was reformed in October 1996, when the Sea King Operational Conversion Unit (OCU) at RAF St Mawgan in Cornwall was redesignated 203(R) Squadron as a reserve unit. In 2008, 203(R) Squadron relocated to RAF Valley in Anglesey, maintaining its role as the Sea King OCU and operating the Sea King HAR.3 until it was disbanded on 14 September 2014 following the withdrawal of the Sea King from RAF service.

References

Citations

Bibliography

External links

 
  

203
03 Squadron
No. 203
Military units and formations in Aden in World War II
Military units and formations in Mandatory Palestine in World War II
R
Military units and formations established in 1914
Maritime patrol aircraft units and formations
Military units and formations disestablished in 2014